Footprints on the Moon may refer to:
For the event of putting footprints on the moon, see Apollo 11#Lunar surface operations.
Footprints on the Moon (1975 film), Italian title Le orme, a 1975 film directed by Luigi Bazzoni and Mario Fanelli
Footprints on the Moon (1969 film) full title Footprints on the Moon: Apollo 11, a 1969 documentary film directed by Bill Gibson
A 2009 book by Mark Haddon
A 2001 book by Alexandra Siy
A 1996 book by Jill Eggleton
Footprints on the Moon and Other Poems about Space, a children's book by Brian Moses
A 1988 book by Maureen Hunter
A children's classroom musical by Jan Holdstock
A fictional band in The Big Bang Theory, formed by Howard Wolowitz and Raj Koothrappali
A song by Gabby Barrett
A 2017 comedy album by Chad Daniels